Glezen is an unincorporated community in Patoka Township, Pike County, in the U.S. state of Indiana.

History
An old variant name of the community was called Hosmer. Hosmer was laid out in 1854 by Stephen R. Hosmer. A post office was established under the name Hosmer in 1870, the name was changed to Glezen in 1883, and the post office closed in 1965. The present name is for the Glezen (or Glezon) family of settlers.

Geography

References

Unincorporated communities in Pike County, Indiana
Unincorporated communities in Indiana